Ada Maris (born June 13, 1957) is an American actress known for her starring roles in the sitcoms Nurses and The Brothers Garcia.

Maris was born in East Los Angeles and grew up there. Her college education came at Boston University and UCLA.

Maris has also been in the NBC series, Deception. Maris was proud of the development of her character, Gina, on Nurses, because she said that Gina "evolved into a real person." Maris has also acted on stage. In 1986–1987, Maris portrayed Maria Conchita Lopez in the syndicated television comedy What a Country!.   In 2004–2005, she appeared as Starfleet Captain Erika Hernandez on several episodes of Star Trek: Enterprise.

Since 1988, Maris has been married to fellow actor Tony Plana.

Filmography

Film

Television

References

External links 
 

1957 births
American television actresses
American actresses of Mexican descent
Boston University alumni
Hispanic and Latino American actors
Hispanic and Latino American women
Living people
People from East Los Angeles, California
University of California, Los Angeles alumni
21st-century American women